Healing the Pain is an album by saxophonist Bunky Green recorded in Califordia and released by the Delos label in 1990.

Reception

AllMusic reviewer Scott Yanow stated: "Green sails in and out of the chord changes and makes most of his solos into a do-or-die situation full of emotional intensity, especially when he plays alto ... Green shows that he is not afraid to occasionally caress a melody and frequently emphasizes unexpected notes ... Green is in top form on what may very well be his definitive recording. Highly recommended".

In the Los Angeles Times, Leonard Feather wrote: "Green has earned scant recognition for his Parker-inspired yet personal alto sax. The ballads are the meat of this season ... Ed Bland, Green’s producer, contributed three themes from his score for last year’s PBS-TV version of Raisin in the Sun. To round out this well-balanced set, Green wrote two provocative originals. He has just the kind of sympathetic rhythm section he deserved".

Track listing 
All compositions by Ed Bland, except where indicated.
 "The Thrill Is Gone" (Lew Brown, Ray Henderson) – 7:30
 "Walter's Theme" – 6:39
 "Who Can I Turn To?" (Anthony Newley, Leslie Bricusse) – 7:14
 "I Concentrate on You" (Cole Porter) – 6:03
 "Love Theme" – 4:41
 "You've Changed" (Carl Fischer, Bill Carey) – 5:50
 "Wild Life" (Bunky Green) – 4:56
 "Radio Theme" – 3:40
 "Everything I Have Is Yours" (Burton Lane, Harold Adamson) – 5:30
 "Seashells" (Green) – 3:46
 "Goodbye" (Gordon Jenkins) – 7:23
 "Love Theme - Reprise" – 1:55

Personnel 
Bunky Green - alto saxophone, soprano saxophone
Billy Childs – piano 
Art Davis – bass
Ralph Penland – drums

References 

1990 albums
Delos Records albums
Bunky Green albums